Björksele is a town located in Västerbotten, Sweden.

References 

Västerbotten